Théophile Beeckman (1 November 1896, in Meerbeke – 22 November 1955, in Meerbeke) was a Belgian professional road bicycle racer.

Major results

1922
Heure le Romain - Malmédy - Heure le Romain
1924
Tour de France:
Winner stage 3
5th place overall classification
1925
Tour de France:
Winner stage 10
6th place overall classification
1926
Tour de France:
4th place overall classification

External links 

Official Tour de France results for Théophile Beeckman

1896 births
1955 deaths
People from Ninove
Belgian male cyclists
Belgian Tour de France stage winners
Cyclists from East Flanders